Douglas William Dockery is an American epidemiologist and the John L. Loeb and Frances Lehman Loeb Professor of Environmental Epidemiology at the Harvard School of Public Health (HSPH).

Education
Dockery received his B.S. in physics from the University of Maryland and his M.S. in meteorology from the Massachusetts Institute of Technology in 1972, where he submitted a thesis titled "An Analytic Study of the Predictability of the Flow in a Dish-Pan Model of the Atmosphere". Later, he gained an M.S. and DSc in environmental health from the Harvard School of Public Health.

Career
Dockery was appointed an assistant professor at HSPH in 1987, where he was promoted to associate professor in 1990 and full professor in 1998. In 2005, he became chair of the department of environmental health at HSPH. In 2008, he was appointed director of the Harvard-NIEHS Center for Environmental Health Sciences.

Research
In the 1970s and 80s, Dockery led the Harvard Six Cities study, the results of which were published in 1993 in the New England Journal of Medicine. In the study, Dockery and his co-authors (including C. Arden Pope) reported that air pollution was associated with increased mortality. The results of this study have been used by the Environmental Protection Agency as the basis for their regulations on fine particulate matter in 1997, and, as of 2005, was the most-cited air-pollution study ever published. In 2009, Dockery co-authored another study which found that improvements in air quality in 51 American cities had led to life expectancies of people living there increasing by as much as five months.

References

External links

American epidemiologists
Harvard School of Public Health faculty
Living people
University of Maryland, College Park alumni
Massachusetts Institute of Technology School of Science alumni
Harvard School of Public Health alumni
Year of birth missing (living people)